Karin Marguerite Smyth (born 8 September 1964) is a British Labour Party politician. She was elected as the Member of Parliament (MP) for Bristol South in 2015.

Early life and career
Born in London, her parents had emigrated from Ireland to England in the 1950s. Smyth was educated at Bishopshalt School, Uxbridge College, the University of East Anglia (BA, 1988) where she was President of the Union of UEA Students, and the University of Bath (MBA, 1995). Smyth worked as an office manager for Bristol West MP Valerie Davey from 1997.

Smyth worked as an NHS manager at Bristol Clinical Commissioning Group. She was a non-executive director of Bristol North PCT from 2002 to 2006.

Parliamentary career
After becoming an MP at the 2015 general election, Smyth became a member of the Public Accounts Committee in July 2015.

On 27 June 2016, she gave support to a series of shadow cabinet resignations aimed at ousting the Labour Leader, Jeremy Corbyn MP, in an open letter to constituents. She supported Owen Smith in the 2016 Labour leadership election.

From October 2016 to July 2017, Smyth was Parliamentary Private Secretary to Keir Starmer, Shadow Secretary of State for Exiting the European Union. From July 2017 to December 2018, she served as Shadow Deputy Leader of the House of Commons and on 30 July 2018 was appointed as a Shadow Minister in Labour's Northern Ireland team.

She attacked the wave of NHS trusts establishing wholly owned companies in 2018, saying that this led to further fragmentation of the NHS and was done purely for tax advantages.

On 28 June 2017, Matthew Niblett was jailed for 14 weeks for threatening to kill Smyth over what he felt was her failure to investigate his case.

Karin Smyth is a Co-Chair of the All-Party Parliamentary Group for Choice at the End of Life.

References

External links

All-Party Parliamentary Group for Choice at the End of Life

1964 births
Living people
Alumni of the University of Bath
Alumni of the University of East Anglia
Female members of the Parliament of the United Kingdom for English constituencies
Labour Party (UK) MPs for English constituencies
Politics of Bristol
Labour Friends of Israel
UK MPs 2015–2017
English people of Irish descent
21st-century British women politicians
Members of Parliament for Bristol
UK MPs 2017–2019
UK MPs 2019–present
21st-century English women
21st-century English people